Thomas Edmund Happold was Head of Multimedia of Guardian News Media. He previously worked on the BBC Ten O'clock News and Channel 4 News. He was previously Deputy Editor of Comment is free.

Since 2013 Happold has run Happen Digital, a digital production and consultancy company. As of 2015 he is also Executive Editor of the LabourList blog, and was chair of the Young Fabians during the 1990s.

References

External links
 Tom Happold's profile page, The Guardian
 Author Archives: Tom Happold, Happen Digital

Living people
Year of birth missing (living people)
British male journalists